Aciliini is a tribe of predaceous diving beetles in the family Dytiscidae. There are 7 genera and at least 69 described extant species in Aciliini, along with 5 fossil species.

Genera
These seven genera belong to the tribe Aciliini:
 Acilius Leach, 1817 i c g b
 Aethionectes Sharp, 1882 i c g
 Graphoderus Dejean, 1833 i c g b
 Rhantaticus Sharp, 1880 i c g
 Sandracottus Sharp, 1882 i c g
 Thermonectus Dejean, 1833 i c g b
 Tikoloshanes Omer-Cooper, 1956 i c g
Data sources: i = ITIS, c = Catalogue of Life, g = GBIF, b = Bugguide.net

References

Further reading

External links

 

Dytiscidae
Articles created by Qbugbot